Five Points Plaza, also known as 40 Marietta Street and formerly known as First Federal Building, is a 17 story,  office building skyscraper in Atlanta, Georgia. The building was constructed in 1964 to house headquarters of the First Federal Savings and Loan Association of Atlanta. Noted for an Oriental architectural design that stands out in Atlanta, the building is devoid of interior columns, making it one of the tallest post-tensioned concrete buildings in the United States at the time of its construction. Five Points Plaza is fully leased to the Atlanta offices of the Department of Housing and Urban Development through 2019.

See also
Architecture of Atlanta

References

External links 

 

Skyscraper office buildings in Atlanta
Office buildings completed in 1964